|}

The Prix Jean-Luc Lagardère, formerly the Grand Critérium, is a Group 1 flat horse race in France open to two-year-old thoroughbred colts and fillies. It is run at Longchamp over a distance of 1,400 metres (about 7 furlongs), and it is scheduled to take place each year in early October.

It is France's oldest and most prestigious event for juvenile horses. It is the country's equal richest race for this age group, along with the Prix Morny. Each has a current purse of €400,000.

History
The event was established in 1853, and it was originally called the Grand Critérium. It was initially contested over 1,500 metres at Chantilly. It was transferred to Longchamp in 1857, and extended to 1,600 metres in 1864. It was not run in 1870, because of the Franco-Prussian War.

The race was abandoned throughout World War I, with no running from 1914 to 1918. A substitute event called the Critérium des Deux Ans was staged at Maisons-Laffitte in 1918.

The Grand Critérium was cancelled in 1939 and 1940, due to World War II. On the second occasion it was substituted by a race at Auteuil, again titled the Critérium des Deux Ans. It was held at Le Tremblay in 1943 and 1944.

The present system of race grading was introduced in 1971, and the Grand Critérium was classed at the highest level, Group 1. For a period it took place in mid-October. It was brought forward to the Saturday of Prix de l'Arc de Triomphe weekend in 1989, and returned to its previous schedule in 1995.

France Galop, the governing body of French horse racing, restructured its program of Group 1 juvenile races in 2001. The Grand Critérium was cut to 1,400 metres and moved to the same day as the Prix de l'Arc de Triomphe. The latter event is traditionally held on the first Sunday in October. The distance was increased to 1,600 metres again in 2015 and dropped back to 1,400 in 2020 as part of a two-year trial.

The race was given its present title in 2003, in memory of Jean-Luc Lagardère (1928–2003). Lagardère was a successful racehorse owner/breeder and a former president of France Galop.

The Prix Jean-Luc Lagardère was added to the Breeders' Cup Challenge series in 2011. The winner now earns an automatic invitation to compete in the Breeders' Cup Juvenile Turf.

Records
Leading jockey (6 wins):
 George Stern – Vinicius (1902), Ob (1903), Val d'Or (1904), Ouadi Halfa (1906), Durban (1920), Clavieres (1923)
 Roger Poincelet – Ambiorix (1948), Cosmos (1951), Tiepoletto (1958), Right Royal (1960), Hula Dancer (1962), Yelapa (1968)

Leading trainer (11 wins):
 Henry Jennings – Miss Cath (1855), Duchess (1856), Isabella (1860), Stradella (1861), Czar (1865), Revigny (1871), Jonquille (1875), Jongleur (1876), Mantille (1877), Basilique (1879), The Condor (1884)

Leading owner (8 wins):
 Marcel Boussac – Durban (1920), Nosca (1941, dead-heat), Caravelle (1942), Priam (1943), Nirgal (1945), Ambiorix (1948), Apollonia (1955), Abdos (1961)
 Susan Magnier - Second Empire (1997), Ciro (1999), Rock of Gibraltar (2001), Hold That Tiger (2002), Oratorio (2004), Horatio Nelson (2005), Holy Roman Empire (2006), Happily (2017)

Winners since 1969

Earlier winners

 1853: Celebrity
 1854: Allez y Gaiement
 1855: Miss Cath
 1856: Duchess
 1857: Tonnerre des Indes
 1858: Nuncia
 1859: Mon Etoile
 1860: Isabella
 1861: Stradella
 1862: Damier
 1863: Sonchamp
 1864: Le Bearnais
 1865: Czar
 1866: Montgoubert
 1867: Le Sarrazin
 1868: Mademoiselle de Fligny
 1869: Sornette
 1870: no race
 1871: Revigny
 1872: Franc Tireur
 1873: Fideline
 1874: Perplexe
 1875: Jonquille
 1876: Jongleur
 1877: Mantille
 1878: Swift
 1879: Basilique 
 1880: Perplexite
 1881: Vigilant
 1882: Vernet
 1883: Fra Diavolo
 1884: The Condor
 1885: Alger
 1886: Frapotel
 1887: Stuart
 1888: May Pole
 1889: Cromatella
 1890: Reverend
 1891: Rueil
 1892: Marly
 1893: Dolma Baghtche
 1894: Le Sagittaire
 1895: Hero
 1896: Roxelane
 1897: Cazabat
 1898: Holocauste
 1899: Ramadan
 1900: Eryx
 1901: Le Mandinet
 1902: Vinicius
 1903: Ob
 1904: Val d'Or
 1905: Prestige
 1906: Ouadi Halfa
 1907: Sauge Pourpree
 1908: Golden Sky
 1909: Uriel
 1910: Faucheur
 1911: Montrose
 1912: Ecouen
 1913: Le Grand Pressigny
 1914–18: no race 
 1919: Odol
 1920: Durban
 1921: Kefalin
 1922: Epinard
 1923: Clavieres
 1924: Ptolemy
 1925: Dorina
 1926: Flamant
 1927: Kantar
 1928: Amorina
 1929: Godiche
 1930: Indus
 1931: La Bourrasque
 1932: Pantalon
 1933: Brantôme
 1934: Pampeiro
 1935: Mistress Ford
 1936: Teleferique
 1937: Gossip
 1938: Turbulent
 1939–40: no race 
 1941: Martia / Nosca 
 1942: Caravelle
 1943: Priam
 1944: Taiaut
 1945: Nirgal
 1946: Clarion
 1947: Rigolo
 1948: Ambiorix
 1949: Tantieme
 1950: Sicambre
 1951: Cosmos
 1952: Dragon Blanc
 1953: Le Geographe
 1954: Beau Prince
 1955: Apollonia
 1956: Tyrone
 1957: Bella Paola
 1958: Tiepoletto
 1959: Angers
 1960: Right Royal
 1961: Abdos
 1962: Hula Dancer
 1963: Neptunus
 1964: Grey Dawn
 1965: Soleil
 1966: Silver Cloud
 1967: Sir Ivor
 1968: Yelapa

See also
 List of French flat horse races
 Recurring sporting events established in 1853 – this race is included under its original title, Grand Critérium.

References

 France Galop / Racing Post:

 galop.courses-france.com:
 1853–1859, 1860–1889, 1890–1919, 1920–1949, 1950–1979, 1980–present
 france-galop.com – A Brief History: Prix Jean-Luc Lagardère.
 galopp-sieger.de – Prix Jean-Luc Lagardère (ex Grand Critérium).
 horseracingintfed.com – International Federation of Horseracing Authorities – Prix Jean-Luc Lagardère (2018).
 pedigreequery.com – Prix Jean-Luc Lagardère – Longchamp.
 tbheritage.com – Prix Jean-Luc Lagardère (Grand Critérium).

Flat horse races for two-year-olds
Longchamp Racecourse
Horse races in France
Breeders' Cup Challenge series
1853 establishments in France